Below is the list of rectors of the Middle East Technical University in Turkey. The first rector  was Turhan Feyzioğlu. The incumbent rector is Mustafa Verşan Kök.

References

 
Middle East Technical University